Sopot Wyścigi railway station is a railway station serving the city of Sopot, in the Pomeranian Voivodeship, Poland. The station opened in 1975 and is located on the Gdańsk Śródmieście–Rumia railway. The train services are operated by SKM Tricity.

The name is derived from nearby horse racing centre (pl. Wyscigi).

A number of sources, including a map from 1919 state that before World War II the stop Schmierau was located approximately 200 m closer to Gdańsk, at the height of the racecourse. Others report that it was a seasonal stop, run only during organised racing.

Train services
The station is served by the following services:

Szybka Kolej Miejska services (SKM) (Lębork -) Wejherowo - Reda - Rumia - Gdynia - Sopot - Gdansk

Gallery

References

 This article is based upon a translation of the Polish language version as of November 2016.

External links

Railway stations in Poland opened in 1952
Railway stations served by Szybka Kolej Miejska (Tricity)
Wyścigi